WWSI (channel 62) is a television station licensed to Mount Laurel, New Jersey, United States, serving as the Philadelphia-area outlet for the Spanish-language network Telemundo. It is owned and operated by NBCUniversal's Telemundo Station Group alongside NBC outlet WCAU (channel 10); it is also sister to regional sports network NBC Sports Philadelphia. WWSI and WCAU share studios within the Comcast Technology Center on Arch Street in Center City, with some operations remaining at their former main studio at the corner of City Avenue and Monument Road in Bala Cynwyd, along the Philadelphia–Montgomery county line. Through a channel sharing agreement, the two stations transmit using WCAU's spectrum from a tower in the Roxborough section of Philadelphia.

History

Prior to the station's formal sign-on, channel 62's original owners held a construction permit under the WDKZ call letters beginning on September 9, 1987, which subsequently changed to WACI that same year. In 2000, the callsign on the license was changed to WPHA. The station formally signed on the air as WWSI on January 17, 2001, originally licensed to Atlantic City, New Jersey, with transmitter in Waterford Township. It acquired the Telemundo affiliation for the Philadelphia market (originally seen on Wilmington, Delaware-based WTGI—channel 61, now Ion Television owned-and-operated station WPPX-TV—until 1998, then WTVE—channel 51—in Reading, Pennsylvania from 1998 to 2000). WWSI launched its website in 2007.

In January 2008, Hispanic Broadcasters Corporation agreed to sell WWSI to ZGS Communications for $10 million. The sale to ZGS was finalized on March 11 of that year.

On March 21, 2013, NBCUniversal entered into an agreement to acquire WWSI from ZGS Communications for $20 million. Prior to the sale agreement, WWSI had been the largest station (in terms of market size) aligned with Telemundo that was not an owned-and-operated station of the network. The deal created a duopoly with NBC-owned Philadelphia station WCAU. The sale was completed on July 2.

News operation
Following the acquisition of WWSI, NBCUniversal announced plans to develop a news department for the station, with plans to debut half-hour newscasts at 6 and 11 p.m. starting January 6, 2014.

The newscasts, titled Noticiero Telemundo 62 began on January 13, 2014, one week from the original planned start date. The newscast name was later changed to WWSI Telemundo News for unknown reasons in late January. WWSI maintains its own control room, which then runs through WCAU's main Digital Operations Center.

The station hired 15 staff members for its news operation (including journalists, reporters, producers, anchors and photographers). On October 21, 2013, WWSI announced the hirings of Claribel Collazo (previously with Orlando Telemundo affiliate WTMO) as its assistant news director and Ramón Luis Zayas, former news anchor of Telemundo's morning program Un Nuevo Día, as anchor of the evening newscasts. On November 3, 2014, the 14 Telemundo O&O's, including WWSI, launched a 5:30 p.m. newscast. This makes WWSI the first Spanish-language station in Philadelphia to have an hour-long evening newscast.

The station launched additional 6 a.m. and noon newscasts to lead into Telemundo's national morning and mid-day news programs on April 2, 2018.

On October 21, 2018, Telemundo 62 debuted its new studio in the new Comcast Technology Center, the same day that NBC 10 debuted its new studio.

Technical information

Subchannels

The station's digital signal is multiplexed:

Analog-to-digital conversion
WWSI discontinued regular programming on its analog signal, over UHF channel 62, on June 12, 2009, the official date in which full-power television stations in the United States transitioned from analog to digital broadcasts under federal mandate. The station's digital signal remained on its pre-transition UHF channel 49. Through the use of PSIP, digital television receivers display the station's virtual channel as its former UHF analog channel 62, which was among the high band UHF channels (52-69) that were removed from broadcasting use as a result of the transition. Until 2018, 49.3 (virtual 10.3) was utilized as a simulcast of WCAU. The sub-channel was signed on in order to keep NBC programming available in areas channel 10's main signal does not reach over the air after the network terminated their affiliation with Wildwood-licensed WMGM-TV.

Spectrum reallocation
On April 13, 2017, it was revealed that WWSI's over-the-air spectrum had been sold in the FCC's spectrum reallocation auction, fetching $125.9 million. WWSI did not sign off, but is sharing broadcast spectrum with sister station WCAU. NBC stated that WCAU had a better signal than that of WWSI. Because WCAU's signal does not sufficiently cover Atlantic City proper, WWSI changed its city of license from Atlantic City to Mount Laurel.

References

External links
 Official website
 Telemundo
 TeleXitos

Television channels and stations established in 2001
WSI
Telemundo Station Group
WSI
2001 establishments in New Jersey
Mount Laurel, New Jersey
TeleXitos affiliates